Andrea Rinaldi (23 June 2000 – 11 May 2020) was an Italian footballer.

Rinaldi started his youth career in Cermenate and in Monza after passing five years at Atalanta. He died in May 2020 from an aneurysm after being loaned to Imolese, Mezzolara and Legnano.

Club career 
Rinaldi started his career in a Cermenate club and at Monza's youth set-up. In 2013, he joined Atalanta's youth sector, for whom he played for the Giovanissimi Regionali A, Allievi and Primavera squads always under Massimo Brambilla's management. For the U17s, he won the national league (in which he scored a goal in the final) and the supercup. After making only two appearances with Atalanta Primavera in the 2017–18 season, in July 2018, Imolese announced that Atalanta had loaned him to them. In Serie C, he only made an eight-minute appearance against Monza on 25 November 2018. He also had loan spells to Serie D side Mezzolara and to Legnano, making 13 league appearances. Rinaldi had made 23 league appearances and scored one goal.

International career 
While playing for the youth of Atalanta, he received a call up for the Italy U18

Death 

On 8 May 2020, Rinaldi suffered a ruptured aneurysm while training in his house in Cermenate. He was immediately rushed to the hospital in Varese to try to save him, but on the morning of 11 May, his heart stopped beating. His funeral was held three days later in Stadio Cermenate at 15:30. Hundreds went to see the funeral, Legnano ultimately retired the number 8 jersey (the number he had worn) and gave it to his family.

Style of play 
Posthumously, he was described by Sky Sport Italy as "a quick and dynamic midfielder with extraordinary athletic ability and speed, the classic modern midfielder, a nightmare for opposing midfielders and for defences when he inserted himself".

Career statistics

References

2000 births
2020 deaths
People from Carate Brianza
Italian footballers
Association football midfielders
A.C. Monza players
Atalanta B.C. players
Imolese Calcio 1919 players
A.C. Legnano players
Serie C players
Serie D players
A.S.D. Mezzolara players
Deaths from intracranial aneurysm
Neurological disease deaths in Lombardy